George Sokolowski (1917-1984) was a member of the Wisconsin State Assembly.

Biography
Sokolowski was born on April 21, 1917 in South Milwaukee, Wisconsin. He attended the University of Wisconsin–Extension division in Milwaukee, Wisconsin and what is now the Milwaukee Area Technical College and became a machinist at the Blackhawk Manufacturing Company. Additionally, he served in the United States Navy. Sokolowski was a member of several organizations, including the Catholic Order of Foresters. He died in May 1984.

Political career
Sokolowski was a member of the Assembly during the 1951, 1953, 1955, 1957 and 1959 sessions. He was a Democrat.

References

Politicians from Milwaukee
Democratic Party members of the Wisconsin State Assembly
20th-century Roman Catholics
Military personnel from Milwaukee
Machinists
Milwaukee Area Technical College alumni
1917 births
1984 deaths
20th-century American politicians
People from South Milwaukee, Wisconsin
Catholics from Wisconsin